Florence Arlene Small (March 27, 1879 - September 28, 1916) was the victim of a brutal murder in her Ossipee, New Hampshire home. Her husband, Frederick L. Small was convicted of the crime and was hanged January 15, 1918.

Personal life
Florence Arlene Small (nee Curry) was born in Brooklyn, New York, on March 27, 1879. She married Frederick L. Small, a Boston broker, in Fayville, Massachusetts, in December 1911. The newspaper reporter believed it was on the 3rd. Florence Arlene and her husband moved to Ossipee, New Hampshire, in May of 1914.

Small was survived by her mother, Elizabeth Curry, and sister, Norma Curry.

Scene of the crime
Small's body was found in the ruins of her home, Mountain View. The house had been destroyed by fire which, because of the remoteness of the cottage, enveloped the house before rescuers could intervene. Though she was badly burned by the fire, examiners found Small to have "a cord about her neck, a bullet wound over one eye and wounds on the head."

Murder charge
Frederick L. Small was charged with murdering his wife, allegedly to collect $20,000 from an insurance policy. Judge John Kivel presided. Attorney William S. Matthews served as Small's senior counsel. County Solicitor Walter Hill and Attorney General James P. Tuttle represented the prosecution. Police Inspector Andrew Houghton of a Boston-based detective agency investigated the case.

Testimony
Local residents of Ossipee testified at the trial to the character of Frederick L. Small and his aggressive physical and verbal behavior towards his wife. Helen Connor testified that when she complimented Small on his wife's cooking, he said that "sometimes he had to take the axe to her." In addition, Philip L. Davis stated that Small "kicked his wife, swore at her, and ordered her into the house" after a flagpole they were trying to install fell to the ground. The local physician testified that he was called to the Small establishment where he found the woman bleeding. Small admitted that he had "struck her over the head with a bootjack; damn it, I should kill her. I will kill her."

According to testimony presented by the State, within 30 minutes  after Florence Arlene ate lunch, Small beat, strangled, and shot his wife before leaving on a trip to Boston. This trip served as Small's alibi, since he was out of town when the house caught on fire. Small had with him his Masonic apron and other valuable papers, even though the trip was to be a short one. However, chemical residue (resin) was found smeared on the torso of Florence's body. Small's 32-caliber automatic pistol (which matched the bullet found on the left side of her forehead) and a clock, that served as a mechanism to start the fire remotely, were found in the house's ruins. This circumstantial evidence led prosecutors to argue the death of Florence Arlene Small was premeditated and not accidental.

Sentencing and appeal
Frederick L. Small was found by a jury to be guilty of first degree murder with a stipulation of capital punishment. Small maintained his innocence.

By New Hampshire law at the time, a year and a day was required between "the passing of a death sentence and its execution." In January 1918, a petition to stay Small's execution was filed. The document alleged that one of the jurors stated that "he knew Small was guilty" before any evidence had been presented in the case. Small's lawyers also filed a motion for a new trial. Both were denied. 

Small was hanged on January 15, 1918.

References

People from Ossipee, New Hampshire
1879 births
1916 deaths
1916 murders in the United States
People murdered in New Hampshire
1916 in New Hampshire